The Women's Match Racing World Championship is arranged by the International Sailing Federation. With female match racing included in the 2012 Olympic Sailing Competition for the first time this section of the sport is growing in popularity.

History
The first ISAF Women's Match Racing World Championship was held in 1999 in Genoa, Italy after having been held at the 1998 ISAF World Sailing Games in Dubai, United Arab Emirates.

For the 2010 edition the Sonar was used.

In 2011 and 2012 the class used was Elliott 6m as preparation for the 2012 Summer Olympics, where Elliott 6m was an Olympic sailing class.

Editions

Medalists

2011
Perth, Australia 
December 
Boat Used – Elliott 6m – 3 Person Crew

Held as part of the 2011 ISAF Sailing World Championships results can be found on that page.

2010
Newport RI, USA 
Boats Used – Sonar (keelboat) – 4 Person

2009
Lysekil, Sweden 
27 July – 1 August

2008 
Auckland, New Zealand 
1–6 April

2007
St Quay, France 
6–11 August

2006
Copenhagen, Denmark 
24–28 May

2005
Hamilton, Bermuda 
15–18 October

2004
Annapolis, USA 
5–12 June

2003
Sundsvall, Sweden 
17–21 June

2002
Calpe, Spain
28 April – 2 May

2001
Lago di Ledro, Italy
2–9 September

2000
St Petersburg, USA
25 November – 2 December

1999
Genoa, Italy
28–31 October

References

External links
Match racing - Women - Elliott 6m

 
Women's International Match Racing Series